Narender Nath is a member of the Indian National Congress party, has been a member of the Indian Legislative Assembly for  the Assembly Constituency Shahdara.

He was born 09-08-1945 in Delhi, and is a Medical Graduate working as a physician. 
 
He has been active in Politics since 1971. He was General Secretary, Shahdara Block Congress Committee up to 1977, Member, Metropolitan Council during 1983-1990, Executive Member D.P.C.C during 1990-1994, and Leader of Opposition in M.C.D in 1997-1998, Vice-President D.P.C.C during 1995-2004. 
He was elected M.L.A in the Second Delhi Legislative Assembly in 1998, Was Minister of Education Technical Education Power Tourism and Languages, Govt. of Delhi during second Assembly. Re -elected M.L.A for the Third Legislative Assembly in December 2003 and in the Fourth  Legislative Assembly 2008.

References

1945 births
Living people